Matías Zagazeta (born 8 September 2003) is a Peruvian racing driver who is set to race in the Formula Regional European Championship with R-ace GP. He is the 2021 F4 British Championship runner-up.

Career

Karting 
A three-time national karting champion having begun his career at the age of eight, Zagazeta quickly switched to international competition, primarily in America. He crossed the pond in 2017, competing in various IAME and WSK events, as well as the CIK-FIA Karting European Championship. He finished 14th in the X30 Senior class of the IAME Winter Cup in 2019, his last year of karting, beating the likes of Lorenzo Fluxá, Léna Bühler and Zdeněk Chovanec.

Formula 4

2020 
After testing Formula 4 machinery for the first time in late 2019, Zagazeta signed with British F4 giants Carlin for his single-seater debut the following year. Having left behind all his family in Lima and racing in tracks he did not know, the Peruvian endured a difficult season, eventually only scoring 34 points. He finished a lowly 12th in the championship, as the second last full-time driver, far from his teammates Zak O'Sullivan and Christian Mansell, second and seventh respectively.

2021 
Zagazeta started 2021 by racing part-time in the Formula 4 UAE Championship with Xcel Motorsport. He got a best finish of 4th from eight races, and finished 14th in the standings. Switching to Phinsys by Argenti for his second British F4 campaign, Zagazeta's results improved drastically, as he got a maiden single-seater podium in the season opener at Thruxton. He would win four races throughout the year, including double victory at Knockhill, and sat at the top of the standings with just two rounds to go. He would eventually lose out on the title to JHR's Matthew Rees by 25 points.

Formula Regional

2022 
In 2022 Zagazeta joined G4 Racing to progress into the Formula Regional European Championship. He immediately impressed in pre-season testing, leading the final session of the Barcelona collective test.

2023 
Zagazeta partook in the 2023 Formula Regional Middle East Championship with R-ace GP during the first three rounds.

For his main campaign, Zagazeta remained in the Formula Regional European Championship, but moved to R-ace GP.

FIA Formula 3 Championship 
Zagazeta took part in the FIA Formula 3 post-season test in 2022, driving for Charouz Racing System during the final two days.

Racing record

Racing career summary 

* Season still in progress.

Complete F4 British Championship results 
(key) (Races in bold indicate pole position) (Races in italics indicate fastest lap)

Complete Formula Regional European Championship results 
(key) (Races in bold indicate pole position) (Races in italics indicate fastest lap)

Complete Formula Regional Middle East Championship results 
(key) (Races in bold indicate pole position) (Races in italics indicate fastest lap)

* Season still in progress.

References

External links 
 

2003 births
Living people
Peruvian racing drivers
British F4 Championship drivers
Carlin racing drivers
Formula Regional European Championship drivers
R-ace GP drivers
UAE F4 Championship drivers
Formula Regional Middle East Championship drivers